Nusse is a municipality in the district of Lauenburg, in Schleswig-Holstein, Germany. It is situated approximately 13 km west of Ratzeburg, and 25 km southwest of Lübeck.

Nusse is part of the Amt ("collective municipality") Sandesneben-Nusse.

References

Herzogtum Lauenburg